Live at the Paradiso – Amsterdam is Live's first live concert album and DVD.

History
The DVD and CD were recorded over two nights at the Paradiso in Amsterdam. Two studio recordings, "Forever" and "Purifier" are included on the album. Singer Ed Kowalczyk said of them, "Both songs kind of have this urgency about them, where we almost missed our deadlines. You can feel the urgency and the energy of the session in the songs".

Despite the fact that the band was on the verge of breaking up, guitarist Chad Taylor was pleased with the DVD. "When I saw the magic that was on camera, I was overcome by emotion. We had documented the energy and efforts of a 20-year career together." However, the long-standing tensions between lead singer Ed Kowalczyk and the other three band members were boiling over. "When the album artwork showed up with Chad, Patrick and I in black and white and Ed in color it shot pain through my veins."

Taylor also revealed that Kowalczyk was unhappy with his playing during the tour which included the Paradiso concerts, "For some reason on that tour Ed would complain about the tuning of my guitar each and every night in the dressing room following the show. He would call Patrick at all hours of the night asking if we sounded okay. I had long talks with the techs. I begged someone to give me anything tangible that I could work on or fix. The board tapes sounded fine but the constant complaining was driving me mad. It was sucking the life out of me on stage."

Track listing
Compact Disc
"Simple Creed" – 4:03
"All Over You" – 3:53
"The River" – 3:12
"The Dolphin's Cry" – 4:37
"I Walk the Line" (Johnny Cash) – 3:20
"Selling the Drama" – 3:28
"Lightning Crashes" – 5:44
"Turn My Head" – 4:09
"I Alone" – 6:14
"Heaven" – 4:07
"Lakini's Juice" – 6:00
"Overcome" – 4:38
"Operation Spirit" – 3:49
"Dance with You" – 5:34
"Forever" – 3:54
"Purifier" – 3:19
iTunes Store bonus track
"They Stood Up for Love" – 5:22

DVD
"Simple Creed"
"All Over You"
"Mirror Song"
"The River"
"The Dolphin's Cry"
"I Walk the Line"
"Selling the Drama"
"They Stood Up for Love"
"Lightning Crashes"
"Turn My Head"
"Wings"
"I Alone"
"Heaven"
"Lakini's Juice"
"Overcome"
"Operation Spirit"
"Dance with You"

Personnel
Live
Ed Kowalczyk – lead vocals, acoustic guitar
Chad Taylor – lead guitar, backing vocals
Patrick Dahlheimer – bass
Chad Gracey – drums

Additional musicians
Christian Matthew Cullen – keyboards on "Purifier"
Adam Kowalczyk – rhythm guitar, backing vocals

Charts

Weekly charts

Year-end charts

Singles
 "Forever" (#25 New Zealand)

Certifications

References

Live (band) video albums
2008 video albums
Live video albums
2008 live albums
Vanguard Records live albums
Vanguard Records video albums
Live (band) live albums